"Heart on Ice" is the debut single by American rapper and singer Rod Wave, released on May 31, 2019, as a single for his fifth mixtape PTSD. The remix of the song, featuring American rapper Lil Durk, was released on September 27, 2019, as a single for Wave's debut studio album Ghetto Gospel.

Background 
The song was first released as a music video on May 22, 2019. On May 31, the single was released. It would serve as the lead single from  Rod Wave's fifth mixtape PTSD, released on June 14, 2019. Though it debuted on the Billboard Hot 100 for the issue dated November 23, 2019, it received even more widespread attention after it went viral on TikTok in 2020. Peaking at number 25 on the chart, it became his first top 40 entry.

Composition 
Pitchfork describes the song as Rod Wave switching between his singing styles "with ease, pairing his melody with a growing ability to write about heartbreak and pain."

Remix 
The remix, featuring American rapper Lil Durk, was released on September 27, 2019, as the lead single from  his debut studio album Ghetto Gospel. Its music video premiered a day earlier.

Charts

Weekly charts

Year-end charts

Certifications

References 

2019 singles
2019 songs
Rod Wave songs
Songs written by Rod Wave